Amos Abbott (September 10, 1786, Andover, Massachusetts – November 2, 1868, Andover, Massachusetts) was a United States Congressman from Massachusetts.

Son of Jeduthan Abbott (1749–1810) and Hannah Poor (1754–1823), he was born in Andover, Massachusetts. He Married Ester West (1796-?) on December 6, 1812. They had two children Alfred Amos Abbott, and Elizabeth Amos Abbott.

He worked as a merchant, a highway surveyor, a market clerk, town clerk, town treasurer, a member of the school committee, a business executive. In 1833, he was one of the founders of the Boston & Portland railway, which later changed its name to the Boston & Maine Railroad, and served as its director from 1834 to 1841. He was a member of the Massachusetts House of Representatives from 1835 to 1837 and in 1843. He was a member of the Massachusetts Senate from 1840 to 1842.

Abbott was elected as a Whig to the United States Congress, serving from March 4, 1843, to March 3, 1849.

Following his term in Congress, he returned to his earlier mercantile activities and served as the postmaster in Andover, where he died, aged 82.

References

1786 births
1868 deaths
People from Andover, Massachusetts
Whig Party members of the United States House of Representatives from Massachusetts
Members of the Massachusetts House of Representatives
Massachusetts state senators
19th-century American railroad executives